Philip Charles Devaney (born 12 February 1969) is an English former professional association footballer who played as a striker.

External links
Phil Devaney profile at clarets-mad.co.uk

People from Huyton
English footballers
Association football forwards
Burnley F.C. players
English Football League players
1969 births
Living people